Leon Trotsky and the Politics of Economic Isolation is an economic history book by professor Richard B. Day about economic views of Leon Trotsky.

References 
 Bailes K. E. Review of Leon Trotsky and the Politics of Economic Isolation // Technology and Culture. — 1974. — Vol. 15, iss. 4. — P. 652–655. — DOI:10.2307/3102261.
 Barber J. Review of Leon Trotsky and the Politics of Economic Isolation // History. — 1975. — Vol. 60, iss. 199. — P. 330–331. — DOI:10.2307/24409205.
 Daniels R. V. Détente: The Historic Potential. Leon Trotsky and the Politics of Economic Isolation // Journal of International Affairs / Richard B. Day, Stephen F. Cohen. — 1974. — Vol. 28, iss. 2. — P. 233–238. — DOI:10.2307/24356744.
 Gyorgy A. Review of Leon Trotsky and the Politics of Economic Isolation // The Annals of the American Academy of Political and Social Science. — 1974. — Vol. 413. — P. 175–176. — DOI:10.2307/1040576.
 Hedlin M. W. Review of Leon Trotsky and the Politics of Economic Isolation // Slavic Review. — 1975. — Vol. 34, iss. 2. — P. 399–400. — DOI:10.2307/2495209.
 Kirstein T. Review of Leon Trotsky and the Politics of Economic Isolation. Soviet and East European Studies // Jahrbücher für Geschichte Osteuropas. — 1975. — Bd. 23, H. 3. — S. 431–434. — DOI:10.2307/41045061.

External links 
 

1973 non-fiction books
American history books
English-language books
History books about Russia
Cambridge University Press books